José Manuel "Pepe" Aguilar González (born 28 January 1970) is a Spanish retired footballer who played as a left winger, and is the coach of FC Cartagena B.

Playing career
Born in Madrid, Aguilar was raised in Santander, Cantabria and was a Racing de Santander youth graduate. After making his senior debut with the reserves, he first appeared with the main squad during the 1990–91 season, achieving promotion from Segunda División B.

Aguilar made his professional debut on 15 September 1991, playing the last nine minutes in a 0–1 Segunda División home loss against Real Betis. In January 1994, after being rarely used, he moved to third division side Racing de Ferrol on loan for the remainder of the campaign.

Aguilar subsequently represented third tier sides CP Cacereño, Recreativo de Huelva, Cádiz CF and Granada CF before returning to the second division in 1999, with CP Mérida. In January 2000, after featuring sparingly, he moved to Real Murcia, and scored the winner in a 1–0 away success over former side Granada in the last match of the play-offs on 25 June, which ensured his side's promotion to division two.

In 2002, after being a regular starter for Murcia, Aguilar signed for neighbouring Ciudad de Murcia in the third tier, again achieving promotion in his first season. In 2005, he joined Lorca Deportiva CF in the second level, but featured rarely.

Aguilar left Lorca in 2006, and played for Tercera División sides CD La Unión and CA Ciudad de Lorquí. In September 2008, after helping the latter achieve promotion to the third division, he retired at the age of 38.

Managerial career
In 2009, Aguilar was named Rafa Muñoz's assistant at Sangonera Atlético CF in the third division. In January 2011, he rejoined Muñoz's staff at CD Leganés, but left the side in the following month.

In July 2011, Aguilar was appointed manager of Club Atlético Perines' Juvenil C squad, while also working for the Cantabrian Football Federation. In July 2014, he returned to one of the clubs he represented as a player, Racing Santander, to work as a Cadete A manager.

Aguilar was named in charge of Racing's Juvenil A squad in 2017. On 31 July 2020, he was appointed at the helm of FC Cartagena's reserves in the fourth division.

On 18 December 2020, Aguilar was named interim manager of the main squad after the dismissal of Borja Jiménez. Four days later, the club announced he would continue as first team manager.

On 11 January 2021, Aguilar returned to the B-side, after three matches with the main squad.

Managerial statistics

References

External links

Pepe Aguilar profile at Cadistas1910 

1970 births
Living people
Footballers from Madrid
Spanish footballers
Association football wingers
Segunda División players
Segunda División B players
Tercera División players
Rayo Cantabria players
Racing de Santander players
Racing de Ferrol footballers
CP Cacereño players
Recreativo de Huelva players
Cádiz CF players
Granada CF footballers
CP Mérida footballers
Real Murcia players
Ciudad de Murcia footballers
Lorca Deportiva CF footballers
CF Atlético Ciudad players
Spanish football managers
Segunda División managers
Tercera División managers
Tercera Federación managers
FC Cartagena managers